İsmail Hakkı Erel (1871 – 22 October 1941) was a Turkish admiral, government minister and Kemalist politician, who was instrumental in modernizing the Turkish Navy in the 1920s. By profession he was a medical doctor.

References 

1871 births
1941 deaths
Place of death missing
Physicians  from Istanbul
Republican People's Party (Turkey) politicians
Turkish admirals
20th-century Turkish physicians